Borovskoy is a village in the Kostanay Region, Kazakhstan. It is the administrative center of Mendykara District and of the Borovskoy Rural District (KATO code - 395630100). Population:

Geography
The village is located by lake Borovskoy,  to the southeast of Kostanay city, the regional capital.

References

Populated places in Kostanay Region